Parliamentary elections were held in Portugal on 13 March 1870.

Results

References

1870 1
Portugal
1870 in Portugal
March 1870 events